Reynoldsville is a borough in Jefferson County, Pennsylvania, United States. The population was 2,759 at the 2010 census.

Reynoldsville was originally called Winslow Township and was renamed after local postmaster Thomas Reynolds in 1850.

History
In 1855 a man by the name of Tilton Reynolds owned the land in what is today Reynoldsville. He began selling lots of property in the hopes of starting a town. Over the course of the 19th century, Reynoldsville would grow into the town that is it is today. Reynoldsville would grow its industries in the way of silk mills, brick and tile works, a tannery, a macaroni factory, and an asbestos plant to provide employment. The borough was greatly enlarged in 1913 when it annexed West Reynoldsville (population 993 in 1910) and three large adjacent areas.

The Herpel Brothers Foundry and Machine Shop was added to the National Register of Historic Places in 2004.

Geography
Reynoldsville is located in eastern Jefferson County at  (41.094465, -78.887604), in the valley of Sandy Lick Creek where it is joined by Soldier Run. U.S. Route 322 (Main Street) passes through the borough, leading northwest  to Brookville, the county seat, and southeast  to Luthersburg. Pennsylvania Route 950 runs northeast from Reynoldsville up the Sandy Lick Creek valley  to Falls Creek, and Pennsylvania Route 310 leads south  to Punxsutawney.

The borough, via Sandy Lick Creek, is part of the Redbank Creek watershed, flowing west to the Allegheny River and ultimately the Ohio River.

Demographics

As of the census of 2000, there were 2,710 people, 1,117 households, and 741 families residing in the borough. The population density was 1,874.2 people per square mile (721.6/km2). There were 1,233 housing units at an average density of 852.7 per square mile (328.3/km2). The racial makeup of the borough was 98.86% White, 0.15% African American, 0.37% Native American, 0.11% Asian, and 0.52% from two or more races. Hispanic or Latino of any race were 0.55% of the population.

There were 1,117 households, out of which 32.0% had children under the age of 18 living with them, 47.0% were married couples living together, 14.8% had a female householder with no husband present, and 33.6% were non-families. 31.3% of all households were made up of individuals, and 17.0% had someone living alone who was 65 years of age or older. The average household size was 2.38 and the average family size was 2.96.

In the borough the population was spread out, with 27.0% under the age of 18, 8.2% from 18 to 24, 26.3% from 25 to 44, 22.0% from 45 to 64, and 16.4% who were 65 years of age or older. The median age was 36 years. For every 100 females there were 92.3 males. For every 100 females age 18 and over, there were 87.4 males.

The median income for a household in the borough was $25,000, and the median income for a family was $34,783. Males had a median income of $31,977 versus $16,705 for females. The per capita income for the borough was $13,592. About 20.4% of families and 25.6% of the population were below the poverty line, including 38.6% of those under age 18 and 11.3% of those age 65 or over.

Schools
Jefferson County - DuBois AVTS (also known as Jeff Tech) is located in Reynoldsville, PA.  It is a comprehensive career and technology school that serves students in 9th - 12th grade from the Brockway, Brookville, DuBois and Punxsutawney School Districts.  The school offers training to students in 14 different career areas. For Elementary education serves C.G. Johnson Elementary School which is a part of the DuBois Area School District.

Notable person
Sparky Lyle, Major League pitcher, 1967-1982

References

External links

Populated places established in 1873
Boroughs in Jefferson County, Pennsylvania
1873 establishments in Pennsylvania